Bowmen of Melville is an archery club located in Perth, Western Australia, founded in 1965. It is registered with both Archery Western Australia and Archery Australia, and is located behind the Melville Glades Golf Club, on Beasley Road in Leeming. The club maintains a membership of seventy to eighty members.

Bowmen of Melville is one of four archery clubs located south of the Swan River in Perth.

When the club was founded in 1965 it was known as Fremantle Y Bowmen. At the time it was located in Fremantle, Western Australia.

The club's facilities include a 45-metre awning, providing protection from rain, wind and sun, with enough space for fourteen targets and over 60 archers to shoot undercover concurrently.

In recent years Bowmen of Melville has been one of the biggest archery clubs in Western Australia. Its membership has at times exceeded 130 members. Although its membership fees are on par with other clubs in WA, it is still higher than other clubs in the eastern states.

Members have regular club shoots at the grounds. The club shoots are regularly target events, however the disciplines of field, clout and even 3D are also shot.

Beginners are also able to shoot at the club, and beginner lessons are held regularly.

Three Australian Olympians, Scott Hunter-Russel, Joanne Galbraith and Taylor Worth, all shot at Bowmen of Melville.

External links
Bowmen of Melville

Sports clubs established in 1965
Archery organizations
Sporting clubs in Perth, Western Australia